is a Japanese football who play as Forward and currently play for Criacao Shinjuku.

Career
Saito was member of the soccer club of Chukyo University. He uses dribbling with a unique rhythm as a weapon, and at the 59th All Japan University Football Championship, he won the Outstanding Player Award as the best FW that led Chukyo University to the second place.

At the beginning of his professional career, he was not able to leave a good track record, but as the quality of post-play improved, he blossomed at once and grew into a central player in Kumamoto's offensive line.

He performed well in the 2012 Emperor's Cup, scoring three goals, including two against the Nagoya Grampus Eight.

In 2013 and 2014, he participated in almost all games except for withdrawals due to accumulated warnings, leading the team's attack and recording his first double-digit score in the 2015 season.

On 20 December 2015, Saito transferred to Jubilo Iwata from 2016. He scored a hat-trick in the Emperor's Cup first round match against FC Gifu SECOND.

On 13 December 2017, Saito joined to Fagiano Okayama as a permanent transfer.

On 10 October 2022, Saito announcement expiration of the contract. On 29 November the same year, he participated in the J League joint tryout held at Kanseki Stadium Tochigi.

On 9 January 2023, Saito announcement officially transfer to Criacao Shinjuku for ahead of 2023 season.

Career statistics

Club
Updated to the start of 2023 season.

References

External links
Profile at Júbilo Iwata
Profile at Criacao Shinjuku

1988 births
Living people
Chukyo University alumni
Association football people from Shizuoka Prefecture
Japanese footballers
J1 League players
J2 League players
Japan Football League players
Roasso Kumamoto players
Júbilo Iwata players
Fagiano Okayama players
Criacao Shinjuku players
Association football forwards